Kathleen McClellan is an American actress, model, television host, and former Miss Illinois Teen USA.

She is perhaps first recognized for her role on Seinfeld as Melissa, Jerry's naked girlfriend, most recently noted for her starring role in the award-winning film, Rattlesnakes, and for her 2002-2004 role as the host of TLC's For Better or For Worse.

Early life
McClellan grew up in Bloomington, Illinois. In 1988, she was crowned Miss Illinois Teen USA, was named Most Photogenic in the National Miss Teen USA Pageant, and was signed to Elite Model Management which began her modeling career in Paris.

Miss Teen USA
The 1988 Miss Teen USA Pageant was hosted by Dick Clark in San Bernardino, California, where McClellan earned the top score in interview, and held the second highest scores in swimsuit, evening gown and overall average score second only to Jessica Collins.

Career
McClellan is known for her work as a dramatic and comedic actor, fashion model, commercial actress, television personality, spokesperson, and television host. Notable modeling campaigns include Skyy vodka, L'Oréal Paris, Cherokee Jeans, Maui Jim Sunglasses, and Hanes. McClellan has starred in countless commercial campaigns including Coors, Budweiser, Chrysler, Visa, and Toyota.

She has been featured in Muscle and Fitness Magazine, InStyle, Mademoiselle, People, TV Guide, Maxim, and Stuff. She was the international spokesperson for and face of Sense Skincare.

She has guest starred on many comedic television shows such as Seinfeld, Murphy Brown, Suddenly Susan, Herman's Head, and The Fresh Prince of Bel-Air.  Recurring roles include Ladies Man and The Bold and the Beautiful. In 1996, McClellean guest starred as an android on an episode of Sliders alongside Eddie Mills and Robert Englund during its third season.

McClellan was the host of TLC's For Better or For Worse (2003-2005).  She was the sideline correspondent for Battle Dome (1999-2001) and host of Surprise Weddings (FOX), and Warner Brothers' Live from the Red Carpet.  She has appeared as herself as a guest host on shows such as Wild On E!, MTV Spring Break, and as herself as a TV personality on Run Away With the Rich and Famous, Search Party and The X Show. She and her home were featured on E! Celebrity Homes.

Her film work includes a role in the film The Set Effect.  She is also featured in Charlie Robison's country music video "El Cerrito Place".

In 2019, McClellan made her comeback in the award winning film Rattlesnakes. McClellan executive produced and starred in it alongside actors Jimmy Jean-Louis and Jack Coleman. McClellan took the film from initial concept to creation with Jimmy Jean-Louis (producer), and collaborated with Julius Amedume (writer/director) to adapt the original stage play set in London in the 1990s, to a modern-day film set in Southern California. Much of the film was shot in McClellan's own Montecito home. Rattlesnakes enjoyed a limited theatrical release starting in April 2019 and played at over 20 international film festivals, winning 8 awards.

Awards 
 Audience award for best feature at the 27th Pan African Film Festival in Los Angeles, California.
 Innovative film award at the Haiti International Film Festival.
 ScreenNation Independent Sprit Film Production Award at the 14th Screen Nation Film and Television Awards in London.
 Best Film award at the 14th Caribbean Tales International Film Festival (CTFF), Toronto, Canada.
 Best Screenplay at the Urban Film Festival in Miami, Florida.
 The Michael Anyiam Osigwe - 2019 African Movie Academy Award For Best Film by an African Director Living Abroad (Diasporia) (African Oscar)
 Winner of the audience choice award at the 9th African International Film Festival 2019. Nigeria
 Winner of the Best Film at the 9th African International Film Festival 2019 Nigeria.

Credits

References

External links
 
 
 
 

American television actresses
American film actresses
20th-century American actresses
21st-century American actresses
20th-century Miss Teen USA delegates
People from Bloomington, Illinois
Female models from Illinois
American television hosts
American soap opera actresses
1970 births
Living people
American women television presenters